†Ophiletidae is an extinct taxonomic family of fossil sea snails, marine gastropod molluscs.

Ophiletidae is the only family in the superfamily Ophiletoidea.

This family has no subfamilies.

References

Prehistoric gastropods